Monterey, Pennsylvania, is an unincorporated community which was added to the USGS Geographic Names Information System on August 2, 1979.

As with the Pen Mar Park to the south, Monterey was the site of numerous resort facilities such as the Clermont House, 1887 Monterey Hotel, the Monterey House, the Monterey Inn, the Monterey Academy, and the Monterey Country Club.  The community's post office established in the late 19th century was named Charmian (another PA post office already was named Monterey), and the Charmian station of the Baltimore and Harrisburg Railway was established after the Western Extension was laid in 1888–1889 (cf. Monterey Station in 1872).

Civil War
As a mountain community near the intersection of the turnpike and the Nichol's Gap Road, the Monterey area was an 1863 American Civil War site through which both Federal and Confederate forces maneuvered during the Gettysburg Campaign (e.g., Buford's Cavalry en route to a June 29/30 Fountaindale bivouac) and a military engagement during the retreat from Gettysburg was at the Monterey location.

References

American Civil War sites
Defunct resorts
Unincorporated communities in Franklin County, Pennsylvania
Pennsylvania in the American Civil War
Unincorporated communities in Pennsylvania